Maickel Ferrier (born 27 January 1976) is a Dutch retired professional footballer who played the majority of his career in the Dutch Eerste Divisie.

Club career
He made his Eerste Divisie debut with club Haarlem during the 1992-1993 season and he also played for Dutch clubs FC Volendam, Cambuur, Helmond Sport, Stormvogels Telstar and TOP Oss, who released him in 2006. He also had a stint in the Italian Serie B with Salernitana who loaned him to Catania.

References

External links
voetbal international profile

1976 births
Living people
Footballers from Enschede
Association football fullbacks
Dutch footballers
HFC Haarlem players
FC Volendam players
Catania S.S.D. players
SC Cambuur players
Helmond Sport players
SC Telstar players
TOP Oss players
U.S. Salernitana 1919 players
Eredivisie players
Eerste Divisie players
Serie B players
Dutch expatriate footballers
Expatriate footballers in Italy
Dutch expatriate sportspeople in Italy